Phoma strasseri is a fungal plant pathogen infecting mint.

References

External links 
 Index Fungorum
 USDA ARS Fungal Database

Fungal plant pathogens and diseases
Mint diseases
strasseri
Fungi described in 1924